The 1893 Carlisle Indians football team represented the Carlisle Indian Industrial School as an independent during the 1893 college football season. The sport was reinstituted after a long absence. The Indians were coached by W. G. Thompson in the school's first year of organized intercollegiate football recognized by the NCAA. The Indians were consistently outsized by the teams they scheduled, and they in turn relied on speed and guile to remain competitive.  The team compiled a record of 2–1; outscored opponents 60 to 16. Richard Henry Pratt laid out the fundamental rule of Carlisle football; "Promise me that you'll never slug."

Schedule

References

Carlisle
Carlisle Indians football seasons
Carlisle Indians football